Joculator brucei is a species of minute sea snails, marine gastropod molluscs in the family Cerithiopsidae. It was described by Melvill and Standen in 1912.

Description 
The maximum recorded shell length is 2.75 mm.

Habitat 
Minimum recorded depth is 66 m. Maximum recorded depth is 66 m.

References

Gastropods described in 1912
brucei